The Minister for Western New South Wales is a minister in the New South Wales Government with responsibility for the region to the west of the Great Dividing Range in New South Wales, Australia.

It was first established in 2011 in the O'Farrell ministry. It was not responsible for any legislation, nor tasked with the management of a department. It was abolished in the second Baird ministry and the NSW Farmers' Association called for its return in the lead-up to the 2019 election. It was re-created in the second Berejiklian ministry, combined with the portfolio of Agriculture, before returning as a separate portfolio in the second Perrottet ministry. The current minister, Dugald Saunders, concurrently holds the agriculture portfolio.

In the second Perrottet ministry there are four other ministers with specific regional responsibility:

 Minister for Regional New South Wales, Paul Toole
 Minister for Regional Health, Bronnie Taylor
 Minister for Regional Transport and Roads, Sam Farraway
 Minister for Regional Youth,  Ben Franklin

List of ministers
The following individuals have served as Minister for Western New South Wales, or any precedent titles:

References

Western New South Wales